Ceesay is a common Gambian surname of Mandinka origin. As well as the family name Touray, it originally indicated the descent of its bearer from a Marabout, a West African Muslim teacher.
Notable people with the name Ceesay include:

Ali Ceesay (born 1992), Gambian footballer
Assan Ceesay (born 1994), Gambian footballer
Babou Ceesay (born 1979), English actor
Hassoum Ceesay (born 1971), Gambian historian
Jatto Ceesay (born 1974), former Gambian footballer
Kebba Ceesay (born 1987), Gambian footballer
Madi Ceesay (born 19??), Gambian journalist
Momodou Ceesay (born 1988), Gambian footballer
Momodou Ceesay (artist) (born 1945), Gambian artist and writer
Saffie Lowe Ceesay (born 19??), Gambian politician and civil servant
Yankuba Ceesay (born 1984), Gambian footballer
Alhaji Yaya Ceesay (born 19??), Gambian politician and former cabinet minister during the first republic (1965–1994).

References

Gambian surnames

Mandinka surnames